The 66 Division is a division of the Sri Lanka Army. Established on 1 January 2009, the division is based in Pooneryn in the Northern Province, Sri Lanka. The division was a part of Security Forces Headquarters – Kilinochchi but now the division is part of Security Forces Headquarters – Mullaitivu and has three brigades and seven battalions.

Organisation
The division is organised as follows:
 661 Brigade (based in Pooneryn, Northern Province)
 15th Volunteer Battalion, Vijayabahu Infantry Regiment
 5th Volunteer Battalion, Mechanized Infantry Regiment
 662 Brigade (based in Paranthan, Northern Province)
 20th Battalion, Sri Lanka Light Infantry
 10th Battalion, Gajaba Regiment (based in Kiranchi, Northern Province)
 18th Volunteer Battalion, Gajaba Regiment (based in Paranthan, Northern Province)
 663 Brigade (based in Kiranchi, Northern Province)
 5th Volunteer Battalion, Gajaba Regiment (based in Kiranchi, Northern Province)
 27th Battalion, Sri Lanka National Guard

References

2009 establishments in Sri Lanka
Infantry units and formations of Sri Lanka
Military units and formations established in 2009
Organisations based in Northern Province, Sri Lanka
Sri Lanka Army divisions